CHM Montalivet (CHM for "Centre Hélio-Marin", "center of sun and sea"), also known as CHM Monta, is the world's first naturist holiday resort located south of Montalivet, in Vendays-Montalivet, France. CHM Montalivet opened in 1950, and the International Naturist Federation (FNI/INF) was founded there in 1953.

The centre

It comprises a mixture of about 1000 privately owned bungalows and caravans, and 960 sites suitable for touring caravans and 260 for camping. The pitch and bungalows are arranged into 20 villages, each having its own character and characteristics. Families tend to return regularly, usually to the same village.

There are the usual sports facilities: tennis, archery, volleyball, football, three restaurants a shopping centre with 20 shops, a cultural centre with a multilingual library and a theatre that screens films. There are two cybercafés and five commercial WI-FI portals, a mail system and cash points. All this is fronted by a  white sand beach, with two supervised swimming points,the second swimming pool has a flume.

CHM Montalivet is family-oriented, and access is limited to those having valid FNI/INF identification. 55% of the visitors are non-French. The single guest is accepted only if presented by their client.

History
Nude bathing has been practised on the Aquitaine coast from time immemorial. It is noted by Marcel Kienné de Mongeot from 1920 along the entire coast. Before the 1939-1945 war, the locals bathed 'sans maillot', and during the war so did the occupying troops. Christiane and Albert Lecocq, from Arras who had been instrumental in setting up a region framework for urban naturist clubs, conceived the idea of combining naturism and travel made possible by paid annual leave, introduced in 1936 in France. He concluded that the 70 hectares on the Île du Levant near Toulon was too small, and through Robert Poulain was introduced to the mayor of Vendays-Montalivet who rented him  of burnt forest that was zoned to become a 'Colonie de Vacances' or holiday resort. The deal was signed 23 July 1950. The legal structure was new. The lease was taken in the name of Albert Lecocq as if it were a suburban club, which would have to be non-profit making. It was to be a 'Centre de Vacances' and thus a separate legal entity that could make a profit and a commercial company SOCNAT was formed in 1954.

Christiane Lecocq recalled that:
"On the terrain we found total desolation. Everything was black or burnt." They had the abandoned concrete from the war, five tents and a hut. There was no shade. We went back to the village to sleep on the floor in an open cabin". In 1951 they had purchased a car, and started removing the barbed wire and munitions. A small space was cleared. The first wooden bungalows were constructed in 1951. A further  was leased under the name of the Féderation Français de Naturisme on 22 December 1951.

The International Naturist Federation was conceived in London at the Festival of Britain but it was at the first congress, held at Montalivet in 1953, that the formal documents were signed.

It was in 1956 that the site was first opened to non-members. A village of tents was set up in the new village 'Océanien'. In 1957, the 'Centre de Vacances' opened with 150 bungalows to hire. Thirty-plus families purchased their own bungalows.

Throughout the 1950s the centre expanded, more land acquired on different leases and the centre became more popular.  By 1959, over 10000 visited during the summer, and on 15 August 1961, more than 3500 persons were on site. As the years passed, the facilities changed, restaurants were next to the beach and the sports and entertainment area consolidated away from the residential areas. Change brought disagreement and then acceptance and expansion. The food shop was originally totally vegetarian, but other shops have arrived and it now remains for a niche market.

In 1966 came the opening of the first official naturist beach in mainland France which by 1968 had emergency helicopter landing pads. By 1968, local sports teams were competing with CHM teams in Monta. The library expanded to 16000 volumes and the entrance was moved to its present location. The perimeter was now .

The 1970s saw more foreign visitors: 37% Dutch, 24% Belgian and 21% German, the rest being from other countries including Australia, New Zealand, Quebec, and America North and South. 1971 saw the construction of the Thermal, and 1975 the first swimming pool. Up to the 1980s, volunteers were in charge of security, access control and maintenance in exchange for free camping and admittance to Montalivet-les-Bains's discothèque, Penelope.

In 1982 in high season, there was a tornado that killed one visitor, exploded caravans and uprooted a  swathe of trees. The following rain flooded many tents and bungalows.

In 1990, forty years after the founding of CHM, a road was named in Montalivet-les-Bain after Albert Lecocq. There is a continual upgrading and replacement of the oldest bungalows.

Personalities
The American photographer, Jock Sturges, used Montalivet as setting for some of his published works such as The Last Day of Summer. There are many other resident and visiting celebrities whose wish for anonymity is respected.

See also
Euronat (naturist resort), another naturist resort in Vendays-Montalivet

References

External links

Montalivet
Nude beaches
Beaches of Metropolitan France
Landforms of Gironde
Naturism in France